5th Middlesex Militia may refer to:

  Bullards' Regiment of Militia also known as the 5th Middlesex County Militia Regiment of Massachusetts, US
 5th or Royal Elthorne Regiment of Middlesex Militia also known as the Royal Elthorne Light Infantry Militia of Middlesex, England